Artur Eduardovich Nigmatullin (born 17 May 1991) is a Russian football goalkeeper who plays for FC Pari Nizhny Novgorod.

Club career
In 2010, he was suspended for 10 months after he failed a drug test. He made his professional debut for FC Mordovia Saransk on 4 April 2011 in a Russian First Division game against FC SKA-Energiya Khabarovsk.

On 16 June 2018, he signed with FC Arsenal Tula.

On 8 July 2021, he joined FC Nizhny Novgorod.

Career statistics

References

External links

1991 births
Sportspeople from Vladivostok
Living people
Russian footballers
Russia youth international footballers
Russia under-21 international footballers
Doping cases in association football
Association football goalkeepers
PFC CSKA Moscow players
FC Mordovia Saransk players
FC Ural Yekaterinburg players
FC Khimki players
FC Volga Nizhny Novgorod players
FC Tosno players
FC Amkar Perm players
FC Arsenal Tula players
FC Nizhny Novgorod (2015) players
Russian Premier League players
Russian First League players